Reinado Internacional del Café 2010, was held in Manizales, Colombia, on January 9, 2010. 19 contestants attended the event. The winner was Mariana Notarangelo, from Brazil.

Results

Placements

Special Awards

 Queen of Water: Dominican Republic Audris Rijo
 Finalists: Bolivia, Poland
 Queen of Police: Brazil
 Finalists: Bolivia, Spain, United States, Venezuela
 Best Face: Dominican Republic Audris Rijo
 Best Hair: United States

Official delegates

Trivia
Elizabeth Mosquera (Venezuela) won Miss International 2010.
Flavia Foianini (Bolivia) competed in Reina Hispanoamericana 2009 and Miss World 2009.
Mariana Valente (Canadá) competed in Miss Universe 2009 and Miss Continente Americano 2009.
Angie Alfaro (Costa Rica) and Blaise Masey (Honduras) competed in Miss World 2009.
Viviana Benítez (Paraguay) competed in Miss Globe International 2009.
Amanda Delgado (United States) competed in Miss Tourism Queen International 2008.
Audris Rijo (Dominican Republic) Won Miss Turismo Dominicano 2009 competed in Nuestra Belleza Latina 2013 placing as 1st runner up.

References

External links
 Instituto de Cultura y Turismo de Manizales
 Alcaldía de Manizales
 Feria de Manizales
 Jimmys Pageant Page

2010
2010 beauty pageants
2010 in Colombia
January 2010 events in South America